Haibin Stadium is a multi-purpose stadium in Shantou, Guangdong, China. It was opened on 28 May 1986 with capacity of 10,000. Association football club Shantou Lions use the venue for home games.

References

Football venues in China
Athletics (track and field) venues in China
Sports venues in Guangdong
Multi-purpose stadiums in China
1986 establishments in China
Sports venues completed in 1986